Pembrey Country Park is a country park on the coast of South Wales, located near the village of Pembrey, Carmarthenshire, and the town of Llanelli.  

The park contains visitor attractions such as ski slopes, adventure play areas, a miniature railway, and mountain bike trails.

The land which the park is located served industrial uses in the 20th century; railway lines, World War II bunkers and pillboxes still remain.

The park hosted the start of the 2018 Tour of Britain cycle race, featuring a peloton of riders including reigning and former Tour de France champions Geraint Thomas and Chris Froome.

Music festival
Beach Break Live is a music festival which was first held at the park in 2010, having been held at other venues previously. The festival is aimed at a student audience.  The event is organised by a pair of entrepreneurs who secured backing from Peter Jones on TV show Dragon's Den.  About 12,500 students attended the first event at Pembrey Country Park in 2010.

Pembrey Ski and Activity Centre 
Ski 
Cobra Toboggan

See also
WWT National Wetlands Centre
Millennium Coastal Park
Pembrey Circuit
Pembrey Airport
Court Farm, Pembrey

References

External links
Carmarthenshire County Council: Pembrey Country Park
www.geograph.co.uk photos of Pembrey Country Park

Geography of Carmarthenshire
Country parks in Wales
Parks in Carmarthenshire
Tourist attractions in Carmarthenshire